Shettleston is a district in the east end of Glasgow in Scotland.

Toponymy
The origin of the name 'Shettleston' is not clear and, like many place-names of possibly medieval origin, has had a multitude of spellings. A papal bull of 1179 refers to "villam filie Sedin" - the residence of Sedin's son or daughter. A Gaelic derivation suggests "the daughter of Seadna".

History
Like several of the city's districts, Shettleston was originally a small village on its outer edge, lying within Lanarkshire. Informally, it incorporates the neighbourhoods of Budhill, and Greenfield immediately to the north, although they fall within another Scottish Parliament constituency and Glasgow City Council ward; however, the Sandyhills neighbourhood to the south-east has the same administration as Shettleston in all respects. The area is well served by public transport, lying on the A89 road.

Shettleston railway station on the North Clyde line of the ScotRail local railway network provides a direct link to Glasgow Queen Street. It once was linked to Hamilton by the North British Railway, but this line has long since been closed.

In the late 1970s into the mid 1980s, Shettleston, like many other districts in the East End, benefited greatly from the Glasgow Eastern Area Renewal (GEAR) initiative, and much regeneration took place during this period.  The area's housing stock was substantially upgraded with tenements being sandblasted and internally refurbished, and coal fires were replaced with gas central heating.  There was also support for small business with a new industrial estate on Annick Street in 1980.  Landscaped areas were created on sites where derelict housing and industrial buildings that were beyond repair had been demolished.  GEAR also saw several of Shettleston's major public buildings replaced with new structures - a new police station in 1983, whilst several medical and dental practices were brought under one roof in a new medical centre in 1985.  Early 1986 saw the opening of the long awaited new building for Eastbank Academy.

In the early years of the 21st century, Shettleston was identified as the only place in the United Kingdom where life expectancy was falling. The reasons for the decline included poor diet and remarkably high smoking rates; neighbouring Easterhouse does not fare much better.

Shettleston was badly affected by the 2002 Glasgow floods.

Churches
Shettleston has a number of churches of all denominations, St Paul's (RC), Shettleston Baptist Church, St Serf's Episcopal Church, Shettleston Trinity Church, Shettleston New Church of Scotland (formerly Eastbank Parish Church), Romanian Orthodox Church in Shettleston Old Parish Church Halls, the Shettleston Old Church Halls was home to a number of community groups, including the 94th Glasgow (1st Shettleston) Company of the Boys' Brigade, founded in 1893. The church closed and parishioners were amalgamated with the Church of Scotland in Tollcross, due to building falling into disrepair in 2016 and as of 2017, is currently up for sale.  In 2018 the 94th Glasgow Boys' Brigade moved base to Shettleston New Church near Aldi and Tesco on Old Shettleston Road/Annick Street. St Barnabas RC Church in Darleith St, Shettleston am sure is still an active Church.

Sport
Glasgow United (formerly Shettleston Juniors) is the local football club, having been founded in 1903 and play in the West of Scotland Football League Conference B.

Military cadet associations
 1089 (7th Glasgow) Squadron, Air Training Corps.
 'E' Platoon (Royal Highland Fusiliers), 'Normandy' Company, Glasgow & Lanarkshire Battalion, Army Cadet Force. (Colloquially known as the 'Beardmore Cadets').
Both units have their headquarters in Killin Street, Shettleston.

Notable people
  
 Junior Campbell, pop musician with 1960s band 'The Marmalade', and composer of the music for Thomas the Tank Engine and Friends. 
 Stephen Fullarton (1919-2008), International Brigades paramilitary soldier in the Spanish Civil War.
 Janey Godley, comedian.
 Cliff Hanley (1922-1999), wrote the lyrics of Scotland's anthem Scotland the Brave.
 Peter McAleese (1942-), British Army and Rhodesian Army/South African Defence Force soldier.
 Archie Macpherson Sports journalist/football commentator.
 Alistair MacLean (1922-1987), 20th century novelist.
 James Beaumont Neilson (1792-1865), engineer, created hot blast iron smelting.
 Charles Wilson, former editor of The Times.

References

External links

 Shettleston - 1770s to 1830s at The Glasgow Story
 Shettleston - 1950s to The Present Day at The Glasgow Story

Areas of Glasgow